The Second Marriage Law, or Revised Marriage Law (RML), of 1980 is a revised law of the New Marriage Law of 1950.  The law was revised by and led by Chinese politician Kang Keqing after a large amount of conflict surrounding the first law, and was changed two years after Keqing's involvement.

Revised Laws 
Domestic Violence – Changes from traditional norms where outside interference wasn’t permitted.  Now law enforcement will and can be involved in order to sue for money or justice.

Abandonment – With many members of families moving away for work, most don’t return to care for one’s family.  The Revised Marriage Law expands on who cares for the needed family member from just parents and children to 3 generations of family.  A clause is stated that government help is only offered if no other option is available.

Divorce – More possible reasons can result in a divorce, formally decided by a judge or a leader of a work unit.  Now reasons for divorce can include domestic violence, addictions from drugs, gambling, cheating, or bigamy.

Added Laws 
The age of a woman to get married was set to 20.  As for a male, the legal age is 22.  All marriages that are under the rules of polygamy were considered to be illegal.  However, the marriages that were intact before the new law were able to stay intact.  All marriages that were considered to be medically unfit were not allowed.  These situations include a person that was unfit to care for themselves.  For example, leprosy is included in this law.  A marriage will become legally official when the court approves it, and no marriage ceremony is required.  Now the choice for the husband to join the wife’s family is an option, as is the wife joining the husband’s.  This sub-law is set to promote the equality between male and female children.

See also 
 New Marriage Law

References 

Marriage law